The cantonal police are the law enforcement agencies for each of the 26 cantons of Switzerland. Law enforcement in Switzerland is mainly a responsibility of the cantons, each operating cantonal police agencies. Some cities also operate municipal police agencies as provided for by cantonal law. The federal government provides specialised services and is responsible for the protection of the Swiss border.

The 26 cantonal police agencies and numerous municipal police agencies are the backbone of Swiss law enforcement. They are not subordinate to federal authorities. Their commanding officers report to the head of the respective cantonal or municipal department of police, who is a member of the cantonal or municipal governing council.

Police training is conducted in cantonal service academies and at the Interkantonale Polizeischule Hitzkirch, a joint police academy of twelve police agencies established in 2007. Throughout Switzerland, the police may be reached by the emergency telephone number 1-1-7 or the international number 1-1-2.

Organization 
Currently, the police authority is exercised by the cantons, which are considered sovereign states within the Confederation. The organization of cantonal police forces generally reflects that of the country whose language is the primary language of that canton.

In the French-speaking cantons, the police are divided into two sections:
However, in certain cantons, the gendarmes have the ability to conduct local or judicial enquiries.

In German-speaking cantons, the police are divided into three sections:

In the Italian-speaking canton of Ticino, the police are divided into geographical areas.

References

External links 
 Links of Cantonal police

Law enforcement agencies of Switzerland
Cantons of Switzerland